Meiffren Conte or Comte (c.1630 - c.1705) was a French painter. He was born in Marseille, but completed his artistic training in Rome, where he was strongly influenced by the work of Francesco Noletti (1611-1654). He worked in Paris and Aix-en-Provence, before moving back to his hometown, where he died. He is most notable for his still lifes.

Sources
Claude-Gérard Marcus, « Un maître de la nature morte redécouvert : Meiffren Comte, Peintre d'Orfèvrerie  », Art et Curiosité, mai 1966.

French still life painters
Artists from Marseille
1630 births
1705 deaths
17th-century French painters
18th-century French painters